North Liberty Park, also known as North Liberty Community Park, is a historic public park and national historic district located at North Liberty, St. Joseph County, Indiana.  The district encompasses two contributing buildings, one contributing site, three contributing structures, and two contributing objects in a public park.  It was developed by the Works Progress Administration in 1935 and 1937.  They constructed the ornamental fieldstone entrance structures, a footbridge, bandshell, tool shed, bath house, and other fieldstone features.

It was listed on the National Register of Historic Places in 2007.

References

Parks in Indiana
Works Progress Administration in Indiana
Historic districts on the National Register of Historic Places in Indiana
Historic districts in St. Joseph County, Indiana
National Register of Historic Places in St. Joseph County, Indiana
Parks on the National Register of Historic Places in Indiana